Philippe Boullé is a Seychellois lawyer and politician. In the country's first multiparty presidential election, held in July 1993, he was the candidate of a three-party coalition known as the 'United Opposition'. He won 3.78% of the vote, finishing a distant third behind the incumbent President France-Albert René (59.50%) and James Mancham (36.72%).

Boullé ran again in the 31 August - 2 September 2001 presidential election, this time as an independent, and finished last out of three candidates, winning 0.86% of the vote.

He ran again as an independent candidate in the 28 - 30 July 2006 presidential election and received just 0.56% of the total vote behind winner James Michel and runner-up Wavel Ramkalawan.

He is also a prominent figure in the Seychelles offshore sector. He owns an offshore firm in the Seychelles, as well as in many other jurisdictions around the world.

References

Year of birth missing (living people)
Seychellois lawyers
Candidates for President of Seychelles
Living people
Independent politicians in Seychelles